Govt Degree College Achini Payan Peshawar is a public sector degree college situated on Ring road near Sarhad University Peshawar in the area of Landi Akhun Ahmad village. Although named as Govt Degree College Achini Payan Peshawar, it is not located in Achini Payan village and is situated at a distance of about 6 kms from Achini Payan eastwards on Ring Road near Pishtakhara Chowk.

Academic activities started for the first time in September 2017. Students of all disciplines are admitted to 1st year of FA/FSc & AD/ADS.

Overview and history 
The foundation stone for Government Degree College Achyni Payan Peshawar was laid in 2012–13. It is situated in Achini Payan on Peshawar Ring road near Landi Akhun Ahmad. The campus of the college is spread over 23 Kanals of land and the current college building has been constructed in 2015. The campus currently has a double-story building containing an academic block, administration block, examination hall, modern laboratories, library, and cafeteria.

Vision 
 To be the center of learning and quality education where all stakeholders have equal opportunities for discourse and wisdom. 
 To equip the students of the area with a range of practices to identify, create, and distribute knowledge and skills in their chosen stream thereby infusing emotional investment in the shape of values and molding them into the future leaders, entrepreneurs in diverse fields, and above all into good human beings.

Departments and faculties 
The college currently has the following departments and faculties.
 Department of Pashto (Chaired By: Prof. Riaz Ahmad) 
 Department of Political Science (Prof. Muhammad Israr Khan)  
 Department of Chemistry (Chaired by Prof. Mujeeb Ur Rehman)
 Department of English   
 Department of Health & Physical Education
 Department of Islamiyat
 Department of Library Science
 Department of Mathematics
 Department of Physics
 Department of Statistics
 Department of Urdu (Chaired by Prof. Fazal-e-Maula)
 Department of Zoology (Chaired by Prof. Ayaz Ahmad)

See also  
 Edwardes College Peshawar
 Islamia College Peshawar
 Government College Peshawar
 Government Superior Science College Peshawar
 Government College Hayatabad Peshawar
 Government Degree College Naguman Peshawar
 Government Degree College Mathra Peshawar
 Government Degree College Badaber Peshawar
 Government Degree College Chagarmatti Peshawar
 Government Degree College Wadpagga Peshawar
 Government Degree College Achyni Payan Peshawar

References

External links 
 Government Degree College Naguman Peshawar Official Website

Colleges in Peshawar
Universities and colleges in Peshawar